Kopriva may refer to:

Places
 Kopriva, Razkrižje, a small settlement in the Municipality of Razkrižje in eastern Slovenia
 Kopriva, Sežana, a village in the Municipality of Sežana in the Littoral region of Slovenia
 Kopriva Peak, rocky peak in Graham Land, Antarctica

People with the surname
 Kopřiva, Czech surname
 Juan Carlos Kopriva, Argentine footballer

See also
 
 Koprivnica